Yetta Barsh Shachtman (1915–1996) was an American socialist politician, who was married to Max Shachtman, a Marxist theorist.

She appears in the letters of classmate Saul Bellow; the two attended Tuley High School. She graduated in 1932. and Bellow delivered a eulogy at her funeral.

Further reading
In Memory of Yetta Barshevsky, by Saul Bellow

References 

American communists
1915 births
1996 deaths